Petr Mainer (born September 10, 1992) is a Czech professional ice hockey centre

Mainer made his Czech Extraliga debut playing with Piráti Chomutov debut during the 2013–14 Czech Extraliga season.

References

External links

1992 births
Living people
Czech ice hockey centres
Sportovní Klub Kadaň players
Piráti Chomutov players
Sportspeople from Plzeň
Czech expatriate ice hockey players in the United States
Czech expatriate ice hockey players in Sweden